Banco Filipino Savings and Mortgage Bank , or simply Banco Filipino, was a savings and loan association based in the Philippines. It is also known for property developments such as BF Homes, subdivisions in Parañaque, Quezon City and Las Piñas. The Bangko Sentral ng Pilipinas ordered the bank's closure on March 17, 2011, and placed it under the receivership of state-run Philippine Deposit Insurance Corporation (PDIC), saying its liabilities topped its assets by P8.4 billion. The slogan of Banco Filipino is Subok na Matibay, Subok na Matatag (English: Proven to be Stable, Proven to be Strong).

2011 closure
Banco Filipino was closed by the Bangko Sentral ng Pilipinas by claiming that Banco Filipino has exceeded its assets with 8.4 billion pesos worth of liabilities which is against Philippine law which states that a bank's assets must equal or be in excess of its liabilities. However, Banco Filipino claims that it had 31.4 billion worth of properties and 23.8 billion pesos worth of liabilities leaving the savings and mortgage bank with 1.6 billion pesos of positive assets showing that its assets are more than its liabilities which could have been used in its planned rehabilitation.

Meanwhile, the Philippine Deposit Insurance Corporation (PDIC) revealed that Banco Filipino depositors whose accounts had at least P10,000 when the bank went on a holiday would be getting paid starting June 2011.

Cristina Orbeta, executive vice president of the PDIC, said the PDIC has settled 53 percent of the closed bank's deposit liabilities, which contained P5,000 or less in their accounts at the time of closure.

See also

List of banks in the Philippines

References

External links
Official website on the Internet Archive

Banks of the Philippines
1964 in the Philippines
Banks established in 1964
Companies based in Makati
Banks disestablished in 2011
Bank failures
2011 disestablishments in the Philippines